Jamesian can refer to:  

  the ambiguous, subjective characteristics of the fiction of Henry James
  the Jamesian Theory of Self developed by Henry James' brother, philosopher William James
  a narrative with similarities to the ghost stories of writer M. R. James (1862 - 1936)
 a follower of James the Just and the teachings of the Letter of James.